Switching may refer to:

Computing and technology
 Switching, functions performed by a switch:
 Electronic switching
 Packet switching, a digital networking communications methodology
 LAN switching, packet switching on Local Area Networks
 Telephone switching, the activity performed by a telephone exchange (telephone switching machine)
 Switching, a synonym for shunting in rail transport

Other uses
 Switching (ecology), a pattern of predation describing predators' selection of food based on its abundance
 Switching (film), a 2003 Danish interactive film
 Switching (pickleball), when doubles partners switch sides of their court
 Code-switching, of languages
 Immunoglobulin class switching, an immunological mechanism that changes the type of antibody produced by B cells
 Task switching (psychology), an experimental research paradigm used in cognitive psychology

See also 
 Switch (disambiguation)